Lynne Marie Allsup (born January 2, 1949), also known by her married name Lynne Olson, is an American former competition swimmer and world record-holder.

Allsup was born in Bloomington, Illinois, and trained with the Bloomington Swim club.

As a 15-year-old, Allsup represented the United States at the 1964 Summer Olympics in Tokyo.  She swam for the gold medal-winning U.S. team in the preliminary heats of the women's 4×100-meter freestyle relay.  She did not receive a medal under the 1964 international swimming rules because she did not compete in the relay event final.

See also
 World record progression 4 × 100 metres freestyle relay

References

External links
 

1949 births
Living people
American female freestyle swimmers
World record setters in swimming
Olympic swimmers of the United States
Sportspeople from Bloomington, Illinois
Swimmers at the 1964 Summer Olympics
Universiade medalists in swimming
Universiade gold medalists for the United States
Universiade silver medalists for the United States
Medalists at the 1967 Summer Universiade
20th-century American women